Loehmann's was an American retail company which started as a single store in Brooklyn, New York and grew to a chain of off-price department stores in the United States. The chain was best known for its "Back Room", where women interested in fashion could find designer clothes at prices lower than in department stores. While the largest portion of its client base was historically women, the chain also offered shoes, accessories, and men's clothing.

Loehmann's filed for bankruptcy in December 2013  and liquidation sales began January 8, 2014. Once the merchandise was liquidated, all stores were closed and Esopus Creek, the private equity fund which had bought the rights to the Loehmann's name, continued to operate the company as an online retailer.
On August 4, 2018, loehmanns.com ceased operations after a period of showing an "under construction" page.

History and operations

In 1921, Frieda Loehmann, a former department store buyer, and her son Charles, opened the first Loehmann's store in a former automobile showroom on the northwest corner of Bedford Avenue and Sterling Place in Brooklyn, New York. She bought seasonal overstocks from top New York designers and sold them at bargain prices. Frieda refused to expand into additional stores, but her son opened a second store, also called Loehmann's, on Fordham Road in the Bronx in 1930, using the same sales strategy.  Frieda continued to run the original store, buying the building and moving into living quarters above it.

Soon after her death in 1962, the Bedford Avenue store was closed, and the Charles C. Loehmann company went public and began to expand to a wider area.

Loehmann's was acquired by Associated Dry Goods in 1983. In 1986, The May Department Stores Company merged with Associated Dry Goods. Two years later, May Department Stores Company sold the 77-unit chain to an investor group led by a Spanish concern, Sefinco Ltd., and the Sprout Group, a division of Donaldson, Lufkin & Jenrette.

The company was taken public again in May 1996.

At its peak in 1999, the company had approximately 100 stores in 17 states.

Multiple bankruptcies
In May 1999, Loehmann's declared Chapter 11 bankruptcy.  It emerged from bankruptcy protection on September 6, 2000. In 2004, it was acquired for $177 million by Arcapita (formerly Crescent Capital), a private investment firm complying with Islamic Banking law. In May 2006, Arcapita sold Loehmann's for $300 million to Istithmar, a private equity firm based in Dubai.

On November 15, 2010, Loehmann's filed for Chapter 11 again, after failing to reach a debt extension with its creditors. It then announced the closing of eight stores.
 
By the end of February 2011, Loehmann's emerged from bankruptcy protection. New York-based Loehmann's said it secured $45 million in financing while saying its restructuring eliminated $110 million in long-term bond debt, $14 million in interests and included $23 million in other cost reductions.

On December 16, 2013, Loehmann's filed for Chapter 11 bankruptcy for the third time, listing assets at $100 million, with debt at $500 million. During bankruptcy, Esopus Creek Value Series Fund LP purchased Loehmann’s intellectual property assets and customer lists starting in March 2014 and Tiger Capital Group, A&G Realty Partners, and SB Capital Group purchased the inventory, furniture and fixtures, accounts receivable, and cash component. In 2017, after Loehmann's Manhattan lease expired, Barneys New York opened its downtown store at the Loehmann’s site at Seventh Avenue and 16th Street in Chelsea. It is the same building where Barney Pressman started his discount men’s business in 1923. Loehmann's began its final going-out-of-business sale at all stores on January 8, 2014, and continued to close its stores, and consolidate its remaining merchandise at its remaining stores during the liquidation process until the remaining stock had been cleared by the liquidator. Loehmann's closed its last store on February 26, 2014, and moved into online-only retailing from that date.

See also
 List of defunct department stores of the United States

References
Notes

Further reading
 Pasquarelli, Adrianne, "Loehmann's defies the odds: Despite going bust twice, discount clothier avoids fate of Filene's, Daffy's", Crain's New York Business, June 23, 2013

External links
 Loehmann's website
 Loehmann's official fashion blog
"The Meaning of Loehmann's, RIP", Marlene Adler Marks, Jewish World Review, June 8, 1999
"Loehmann's New Owner Keeps the Faith", Barney Gimbel, Fortune, February 7, 2005

Defunct department stores based in New York City
Discount stores of the United States
Companies based in the Bronx
Defunct companies based in New York City
American companies established in 1921
Retail companies established in 1921
Retail companies disestablished in 2014
1921 establishments in New York City
2014 disestablishments in New York (state)
Companies that filed for Chapter 11 bankruptcy in 1999
Companies that filed for Chapter 11 bankruptcy in 2010
Companies that filed for Chapter 11 bankruptcy in 2013
Privately held companies based in New York City